Sabita Begum is a Bangladeshi Jatiya Party (Ershad) politician and a Member of the Bangladesh Parliament from a reserved seat.

Career
Begum was elected to parliament from reserved seat as a Jatiya Party (Ershad) candidate in 1996.

References

Jatiya Party (Ershad) politicians
Living people
Women members of the Jatiya Sangsad
7th Jatiya Sangsad members
Year of birth missing (living people)
20th-century Bangladeshi women politicians
Jatiya Party politicians